Leo Edward O'Neil (January 31, 1928 – November 30, 1997) was an American prelate of the Roman Catholic Church. He served as bishop of the Diocese of Manchester in New Hampshire from 1990 until his death in 1997.

Biography

Early life 
Leo O'Neil was born on January 31, 1928, in Holyoke, Massachusetts.  He attended both Blessed Sacrament School and Sacred Heart High School in that town. In 1945 he entered Maryknoll Junior Seminary in Clarks Summit, Pennsylvania. He studied at Saint Anselm College in Goffstown, New Hampshire, for a year before attending the Grand Seminary of Montreal in Montreal, Quebec from 1950 to 1955. 

O'Neil was ordained to the priesthood for the Diocese of Springfield by Bishop Christopher Weldon on June 4, 1955. He then served as parochial vicar in several parishes in the diocese and was named pastor of St. Mary of the Assumption Parish at Haydenville, Massachusetts, in 1976.

Auxiliary Bishop of Springfield 
On June 30, 1980, O'Neil was appointed auxiliary bishop of the Diocese of Springfield and Titular Bishop of Bencenna by Pope John Paul II. He received his episcopal consecration on August 22 , 1980, from Bishop Joseph Maguire, with Bishops Tomás Roberto Manning and Timothy Harrington serving as co-consecrators.

Coadjutor Bishop and Bishop of Manchester 
John Paul II named O'Neil as coadjutor bishop of the Diocese of Manchester on October 17, 1989.  When Bishop Odore Gendron retired, O'Neil automatically succeeded him on June 12, 1990. He was installed at the Cathedral of St. Joseph in Manchester on November 30, 1990.

During his tenure, O'Neil worked to foster a common vision among New Hampshire Catholics with a program entitled "Renewing the Covenant." He also won the affection of people with his inspirational homilies and flair for poetry. On November 30, 1993, O'Neil underwent surgery for multiple myeloma. He continued to battle with cancer and serve as bishop for four more years, until his death at age 69 on November 30, 1997 — the seventh anniversary of his installation.

References

1928 births
1997 deaths
People from Holyoke, Massachusetts
Roman Catholic Diocese of Springfield in Massachusetts
Roman Catholic bishops of Manchester
20th-century Roman Catholic bishops in the United States
Saint Anselm College alumni
Deaths from multiple myeloma
Religious leaders from Massachusetts
Catholics from Massachusetts